State Route 69 (SR 69) is a highway that serves as the main road to Prescott, Arizona, from Interstate 17. It is almost all divided four-lane although some sections in Prescott and Prescott Valley are wider). Prior to the construction of Interstate 17 in the 1960s and early 1970s, State Route 69 continued south to Phoenix, Arizona, as the Prescott-Phoenix Hwy or Black Canyon Highway on a different alignment, through the ghost towns of Bumble Bee and Cordes.

Route description

The southern terminus of SR 69 is located at exit 262 of I-17, at a spot known as Cordes Junction.  It heads northwest from this interchange passing through Mayer before curving towards the north at Poland Junction. It continues north to a junction with SR 169 in Dewey-Humboldt. The highway gradually curves towards the west after this junction as it heads through Prescott Valley. It continues its gradual curve towards the southwest until it curves towards the west near Yavapai Hills. The highway continues towards the west until it reaches its terminus at SR 89 in Prescott.

History

In 1938, SR 69 began showing on state maps for the new route between Phoenix and Prescott. This older road still exists along a stretch from Mayer southeast through Cordes and Bumble Bee and terminating in Black Canyon City. SR 69 was truncated from Phoenix to Cordes Junction in the late 1960s after Interstate 17 was completed.

Junction list

References

Expressways in the United States
069
Prescott, Arizona
Transportation in Yavapai County, Arizona
Prescott Valley, Arizona